Ruleville Depot is a historic railroad depot on the east side of railroad tracks at the junction of East Floyce Street and North Front Street in Ruleville, Mississippi. It was constructed in 1930 by the Yazoo and Mississippi Valley Railroad following its purchase by the Illinois Central Railroad. Railway service to Ruleville began in 1897, when the Yazoo Delta Railroad built a line to the city; the original 1897 depot was replaced in 1913 after a tornado hit it, and the 1913 building was in turn replaced by the 1930 building. The station received both passenger and freight service, with two passenger trains and multiple freight trains serving the station each day. Passenger service to the station ended in the 1950s, and the station closed entirely in 1978. It is currently owned by the Ruleville Chamber of Commerce.

The station was added to the National Register of Historic Places on July 15, 1999.

References

Railway stations on the National Register of Historic Places in Mississippi
Railway stations in the United States opened in 1930
National Register of Historic Places in Sunflower County, Mississippi
Railway stations closed in 1978
Transportation in Sunflower County, Mississippi
Yazoo and Mississippi Valley Railroad
Former Illinois Central Railroad stations
Former railway stations in Mississippi